The Peterborough–Lincoln line is a railway line linking  and , via  and . Between Lincoln and Spalding, the line follows the route of the former Great Northern and Great Eastern Joint Railway.

History 
The section between Peterborough and Spalding closed to passengers on 5 October 1970 and re-opened on 7 June 1971. North of Spalding, Ruskington re-opened on 5 May 1975. Metheringham followed on 6 October 1975.

Intermediate stations south of Sleaford did not re-open (see diagram).  There has been agitation by local communities to re-open Littleworth on a park-and-ride basis for Peterborough. In 2016 this was costed at £4.3 million as it would need a footbridge and car parking availability.

Between 1848 and 1963, the Lincolnshire loop line ran from Spalding to Lincoln via Boston, Woodhall Junction and Bardney where they connected to other branch lines including the East Lincolnshire Railway, Kirkstead and Little Steeping Railway and the Horncastle Railway. The section between Lincoln and Boston closed to passengers in 1963. However the route between Boston and Spalding closed in 1964. Only the section from Lincoln to Woodhall Junction which provided links to Horncastle and Firsby remained open until between 1970–1971 to both passengers and freight traffic. Today, the section from Lincoln to Woodhall Junction forms part of the Water Rail Way footpath and between Boston and Spalding. The trackbed has been converted to form part of the A16.

Description 
The towns and villages served by the route are listed below;
 Peterborough
 Spalding
 Sleaford
 connections with Grantham–Skegness line
 Ruskington
 Metheringham
 Lincoln

After an upgrade in 2015, the route through to Lincoln (and beyond to Doncaster) has a regular role as a diversionary route for trains from the East Coast Main Line mostly for slower freight services, but occasionally for passenger trains too. As a result, the route is now open 24 hours per day. In September 2018 a new grade separated junction at Werrington was under construction to allow freight and passenger services to dive under the East Coast Main Line. It was opened in 2021.

Infrastructure 
The line is not electrified. The line is controlled by Lincoln signalling centre from Werrington Junction to Lincoln, worked under track circuit block regulations (TCB). However, Sleaford East box remains for now: resignalling is due around 2019/2020, when the whole area will switch to York Rail Operating Centre (ROC) along with Lincoln signalling centre.

Linespeeds 
 Werrington Junction (excl) to Spalding: 70mph (Down – toward Doncaster) 75mph (Up – toward Peterborough)
 Spalding: 50mph
 Spalding (excl) to Sleaford South Junction: 75mph
 Sleaford avoiding lines: 55mph
 Sleaford to Lincoln: 75mph

Incidents 
One person died and 30 people were injured in the Nocton rail accident when a train hit a vehicle on the tracks at the site of a removed bridge, on 28 February 2002.

On 6 December 2004 two people died in a collision between a car and a class 153 DMU on a user operated crossing south east of Helpringham.

References 

Rail transport in Lincolnshire
Transport in Peterborough
Railway lines in the East of England
Standard gauge railways in England